|}

This is a list of electoral district results of the 2013 Western Australian election.

Results by Electoral district

Albany

Alfred Cove

Armadale

Balcatta

Bassendean

Bateman

Belmont

Bunbury

Butler

Cannington

Carine

Central Wheatbelt

Churchlands

Cockburn

Collie-Preston

Cottesloe

Darling Range

Dawesville

Eyre

Forrestfield

Fremantle

Geraldton

Girrawheen

Gosnells

Hillarys

Jandakot

Joondalup

Kalamunda

Kalgoorlie

Kimberley

Kingsley

Kwinana

Mandurah

Maylands

Midland

Mirrabooka

Moore

Morley

Mount Lawley

Murray-Wellington

Nedlands

North West Central

Ocean Reef

Perth

Pilbara

Riverton

Rockingham

Scarborough

Southern River

South Perth

Swan Hills

Vasse

Victoria Park

Wagin

Wannerooo

Warnbro

Warren-Blackwood

West Swan

Willagee

See also 

 Results of the Western Australian state election, 2013 (Legislative Council)
 2013 Western Australian state election
 Candidates of the Western Australian state election, 2013
 Members of the Western Australian Legislative Assembly, 2013–2017

References 

Results of Western Australian elections